The Play-offs of the 1995 Fed Cup Asia/Oceania Zone Group II were the final stages of the Group II Zonal Competition involving teams from Asia and Oceania. Those that qualified for this stage placed first and second in their respective pools.

The four teams were then paired up the team from a different placing of the other group for a play-off tie, with the winners being promoted to Group I in 1996.

Uzbekistan vs. Malaysia

  advanced to Group I in 1996, where they placed last in their pool of four and as such were relegated back to Group II for 1997.

India vs. Singapore

  advanced to Group I in 1996, where they placed second in their pool of four.

See also
Fed Cup structure

References

External links
 Fed Cup website

1995 Fed Cup Asia/Oceania Zone